This page documents all tornadoes confirmed by various weather forecast offices of the National Weather Service in the United States from January to March 2022. In a recent 2000–2020 period, an average January features 32 tornadoes across the United States, the lowest month in a given year; the broader 1991–2010 climatology is slightly higher at 35. These tornadoes are commonly focused across the Southern United States due to their proximity to the unstable airmass and warm waters of the Gulf of Mexico, as well as California in association with winter storms. The year's first tornado, part of a broader outbreak on New Year's Day, caused EF2 damage on the Enhanced Fujita scale in Hopkinsville, Kentucky, a region hit particularly hard from one of the deadliest and largest December outbreaks on record.

Overall, January was a relatively average month for tornadoes, with 37 confirmed. February saw only 11 tornadoes, which was below the average of 30. As spring approached, a dramatic upswing occurred in March as 234 tornadoes were confirmed in the United States, the most on record in that month and well above the average of 80. Several large tornado outbreaks that month helped to ramp up tornadic activity.

United States yearly total

January

January 1 event

January 2 event

January 3 event

January 8 event

January 9 event

January 16 event

February

February 3 event

February 17 event

February 22 event

March

March 5 event

March 6 event

March 7 event

March 9 event

March 11 event

March 12 event

March 14 event

March 16 event

March 18 event

March 21 event

March 22 event

March 23 event

March 29 event

March 30 event

March 31 event

See also
 Tornadoes of 2022
 List of United States tornadoes in December 2021
 List of United States tornadoes in April 2022

Notes

References 

2022-related lists
Tornadoes of 2022
Tornadoes
2022, 1
2022 natural disasters in the United States
Tornadoes in the United States